</noinclude>
"Ice Cream Dream" is a song by American rapper MC Lyte in 1992. The song was used to promote the 1992 motion picture Mo' Money. It was written by Lyte with Jimmy Jam and Terry Lewis, famous primarily for their work with Janet Jackson, and released as single from the soundtrack album of the movie on October 27, 1992, through Jam & Lewis's label Perspective Records.

With a production oriented to the New Jack Swing sound, in the song Lyte talks about her preference for men, metaphorically comparing them to ice cream cone. Ice Cream Dream has more sexual lyrical content than their previously released singles.

Conception and composition
With a production oriented to the New Jack Swing sound, in the song Lyte talks about her preference for men, metaphorically comparing them to ice cream cone "Dark, handsome, six feet tall/Thirty-one flavors, I believe he’s got ‘em all." Ice Cream Dream has more sexual lyrical content than their previously released singles "Forget the chase--I'm prepared to get a taste/Licky here, licky there cuz I like it/Too much to eat--so I guess I'll bite it."

In 2018 Jam & Lewis spoke to Okayplayer about some of their most prominent production work, commenting on the song:

The song also has Lisa Keith, who had previously collaborated as backing vocalist on songs by Herb Alpert, Janet Jackson, and The Human League, singing on her hook.

Samples
It is built around a sample of EPMD hit song "So Wat Cha Sayin'". The single features a Jermaine Dupri remix which in turn contains samples of multiple elements from the previous song "Lyte as a Rock", T La Rock and Jazzy Jay's "It's Yours" and Uncle Louie's "Like Funky Music", plus vocals of "Pee-Wee's Dance" by Joeski Love, "Put Your Love (In My Tender Care)" by Fatback Band and "The Breakdown (Part I)" by Rufus Thomas.

Critical reception
In his book Reflecting Black: African-American Cultural Criticism (1993), academic and author Michael Eric Dyson described the song as "a delicious ode to erotic desire" in which Lyte "seductively embellishes a conceit drawn from quotidian experience".

In 2013 Cedric Muhammad would analyze the trajectory of Jam & Lewis for Forbes magazine, in which he would describe the song as "risque" and ask "how perfect is Lisa Keith’s voice in chorus?"

In 2017, in a retrospective review of the soundtrack album, Todd Stereo Williams of The Boombox considered Lyte's song "One of her most underrated cuts", highlighting as in its artistic maturation "she wasn't afraid to embrace R&B" even though made her first appearance as a battle rapper in the 80s.

Track listing

US 7" Vinyl
A-Side
 "Ice Cream Dream" (7" Radio Mix)
B-Side
 "Ice Cream Dream" (Remix Radio Edit)

UK 12" Vinyl
A-Side
 "Ice Cream Dream" (Album Version)
 "Ice Cream Dream" (12" Remix)
B-Side
 "Ice Cream Dream" (Straight Pass)
 "Ice Cream Dream" (Remix Radio Edit)

12" Vinyl
A-Side
 "Ice Cream Dream" (Remix 12") (5:42)
 "Ice Cream Dream" (Album Version) (4:25)
 "Ice Cream Dream" (12" Remix)
 "Ice Cream Dream" (Remix Radio Edit) (3:49)

CD Version 
A-Side
 "Ice Cream Dream" (7" Radio Mix)
 "Ice Cream Dream" (Remix Radio Edit)
 "Ice Cream Dream" (12" Remix)
 "Ice Cream Dream" (Straight Pass)
 "Ice Cream Dream" (Album Version)

Cassette 
 "Ice Cream Dream" (7" Radio Mix)
 "Ice Cream Dream" (Remix Radio Edit)
 "Ice Cream Dream" (12" Remix)
 "Ice Cream Dream" (Straight Pass)
 "Ice Cream Dream" (Album Version)

Personnel
Credits are taken from the liner notes.
Executive-Producer – Nat Robinson
Mastered By – Dennis King (D.K.)
Producer, Written-By – Audio Two (tracks: A2 to B2), King Of Chill (tracks: A1)
Programmed By, Engineer, Music By [Music Performed By] – Audio Two
Written-By – MC Lyte

Charts

References

1992 songs
1992 singles
Songs written by Jimmy Jam and Terry Lewis
MC Lyte songs
Perspective Records singles
A&M Records singles
Songs written by MC Lyte